Marie-Hélène Poitras (born 1975) is a Canadian writer living in Montreal, Quebec.

She was born in Ottawa, Ontario. She received a master's degree in literary studies from the Université du Québec à Montréal. Poitras is a journalist reporting on music for the magazine Voir; she also hosts a radio program for Radio-Canada.

Her first novel Soudain le Minotaure received the Prix Anne-Hébert in 2003. She also published a series for adolescents Rock & Rose in 2009. Her books have been translated into English, Spanish and Italian. The English translation of Soudain le Minotaure. Suddenly the Minotaur, was shortlisted for a ReLit Award in 2007.

References 

1975 births
Living people
Canadian women novelists
Canadian novelists in French
Journalists from Montreal
Journalists from Ontario
Université du Québec à Montréal alumni
Writers from Montreal
Writers from Ottawa
Canadian women non-fiction writers